Harayama Dam is an earthfill dam located in Toyama prefecture in Japan. The dam is used for irrigation. The catchment area of the dam is 0.5 km2. The dam impounds about 1  ha of land when full and can store 35 thousand cubic meters of water. The construction of the dam was completed in 1939.

References

Dams in Toyama Prefecture
1939 establishments in Japan